Breezy is a 1973 American romantic drama film starring William Holden and Kay Lenz.

Breezy may also refer to:

Nickname
Muriel Bevis (1928–2002), outfielder and pitcher in the All-American Girls Professional Baseball League in 1950
Breezy Bishop, longtime girls basketball coach at Western Senior High School in Baltimore, Maryland
Chris Brown (born 1989), American singer
Brianna Dotson, co-founder of Coco & Breezy, an American fashion accessory company
B. Reeves Eason (1886–1956), American film director, actor, and screenwriter
Breezy Johnson (born 1996), American alpine skier
Floyd Reid (born 1927), American retired National Football League running back

Music
 Breezy (album), by Chris Brown, 2022
 "Breezy", a 2022 song by Meghan Trainor from Takin' It Back

Other uses
Breezies, characters in the My Little Pony toy franchise
Breezy (software), a distributed version control system which is a fork of GNU Bazaar
RLU-1 Breezy, an experimental homebuilt aircraft

Lists of people by nickname